Russell Green (13 August 1933 – 21 April 2012) was an English professional footballer who played as a wing half.

Career
Born in Donington, Green made 125 appearances in the Football League for Lincoln City between 1957 and 1964, and also played non-league football for Corby Town and Gainsborough Trinity.

Russell Green, a former blacksmith's apprentice, was an exceptionally strong and fit player, once described as 'a "they shall not pass" sort of player'. He was part of Lincoln City's famous "Great Escape" team of 1957–58, which seemed doomed to relegation from Division 2, but then narrowly avoided the drop by winning all their last 6 games.

Although wing-half was probably his favoured position, Lincoln City manager Bill Anderson frequently played the versatile Green at fullback. During the 1961–62 season he also served a stint playing at centre forward, and scored a match-winning hat trick when Lincoln beat Newport County 3–2.

Subsequently, as captain and player coach at Gainsborough Trinity, Green again played in a variety of positions, this time including centre-half. He led Trinity to the Midlands Counties League championship in the 1966–67 season.

References

2012 deaths
English footballers
Association football wing halves
Corby Town F.C. players
Lincoln City F.C. players
Gainsborough Trinity F.C. players
English Football League players
Gainsborough Trinity F.C. managers
1933 births
People from Donington, Lincolnshire
English football managers